Working Nights is the debut album by the British jazz dance band Working Week, that was released by Virgin Records in 1985. The album reached #23 in the UK album charts in April 1985. Working Nights was reissued in 2012 as a remastered 2-disc Deluxe Set by Cherry Red Records.

Track listing
All tracks composed by Simon Booth and Larry Stabbins, except where noted.

 "Inner City Blues" (Marvin Gaye, James Nyx Jr.) – 5:44
 "Sweet Nothing" (Booth) – 3:39
 "Who’s Fooling Who" – 5:04
 "Thought I’d Never See You Again" – 6:26
 "Autumn Boy" – 6:33
 "Solo" – 4:40
 "Venceremos" (Booth) – 4:41
 "No Cure No Pay" (Stabbins) – 8:28

2012 Cherry Red Records reissue
Disc 1
 "Inner City Blues" (Gaye, Nyx Jr.) – 5:44
 "Sweet Nothing" (Booth) – 3:39
 "Who’s Fooling Who" – 5:04
 "Thought I’d Never See You Again" – 6:26
 "Autumn Boy" – 6:33
 "Solo" – 4:40
 "Venceremos" (Booth) – 4:41
 "No Cure No Pay" (Stabbins) – 8:28
 "Stella Marina" (Main Mix) (Stabbins, Jalal) – 11:04
 "Storm of Light" – 6:40
 "Bottom End" (Booth) – 5:45
 "Venceremos (We Will Win)" (Jazz Dance Special 12" Edit) (Booth) – 4:08

Disc 2
 "Venceremos (We Will Win)" (Jazz Dance Special 12" Version) (Booth) – 10:17
 "Afochê" (Stabbins) – 10:17
 "Murphy’s Law" (live previously unissued) (Stabbins) – 7:37
 "Pepe’s Samba" (live previously unissued) (Chico Freeman) – 8:39
 "Inner City Blues" (Urbane Guerrilla Mix) (Gaye, Nyx Jr.) – 5:45
 "Storm of Light" (Instrumental) – 3:24
 "Who’s Fooling Who" (Dance Version) – 4:45
 "Sweet Nothing" (Instrumental) (Booth) – 3:41
 "Where’s the Bridge" (Longer Mix) (Booth, Stabbins, Juliet Roberts) – 5:09
 "Venceremos" (We Will Win) (7" Bossa Version) (Booth) – 4:42
 "Stella Marina" (Full Rap)" (Stabbins, Jalal) – 8:35

Personnel
Working Week
 Juliet Roberts – vocals
 Simon Booth – guitars
 Larry Stabbins – tenor and soprano saxophone and flute
with:
 Kim Burton – piano
 Mike Carr – organ (disc 1, track 10; disc 2, track 6)
 Roy Dodds – drums (disc 1, tracks 2, 5, 6, 8, 9; disc 2, track 11)
 Nic France – drums (disc 1, tracks 1, 3, 4)
 Mark Taylor – drums (disc 1, tracks 1, 12; disc 2, tracks 1, 10)
 Louis Moholo – drums (disc 1, track 9; disc 2, track 11)
 Ernest Mothle – bass (disc 1, tracks 2, 5, 6, 8, 9; disc 2, track 11)
 Chucho Merchán – bass (disc 1, tracks 1, 3, 4, 7, 12; disc 2, tracks 1, 10)
 Dawson Miller and Bosco De Oliveira – percussion (disc 1, tracks 2, 5-9, 12; disc 2, tracks 10, 11)
 Martin Ditcham – percussion (disc 1, tracks 1, 3, 4)
 Robin Millar – additional guitar (disc 1, tracks 1, 3, 5)
 Leroy Osbourne – backing vocals (disc 1, track 2)
 Tracey Thorn – guest vocals (disc 1, track 12; disc 2, tracks 1, 10)
 Robert Wyatt – guest vocals (disc 1, track 12; disc 2, tracks 1, 10)
 Julie Tippetts – guest vocals (disc 1, track 9, 10; disc 2, track 11)
 Jalal – guest vocals (disc 1, track 9; disc 2, track 11)
 Claudia Figueroa – guest vocals (disc 1, track 7, 12; disc 2, tracks 1, 10)
 Guy Barker – trumpet and flugelhorn (disc 1, tracks 1, 3, 4)
 Stuart Brooke – trumpet (disc 1, track 1)
 Harry Beckett – trumpet (disc 1, tracks 2, 5, 11; disc 2, tracks 6, 8)
 Paul Spong – trumpet (disc 1, track 6)
 Annie Whitehead – trombone (disc 1, tracks 2, 6, 8, 9)
 Malcolm Griffiths – trombone (disc 1, track 4)
 Paul Nieman – trombone (disc 1, track 1)
 Chris Biscoe – alto saxophone (disc 1, track 3)
 Ray Warleigh – alto and baritone saxophone (disc 1, tracks 1, 3)
 Dave Bitelli – clarinet and baritone saxophone (disc 1, track 12; disc 2, tracks 1, 10)
 Nick Ingman – string arrangements

Charts

Album charts

References

1985 debut albums
Working Week albums
Albums produced by Robin Millar